Mar Shimun XI Eshuyow was the sixth Patriarch of the Chaldean Catholic Church, from 1638 to 1656.

He succeeded Patriarch Shimun X Eliyah, The seat of the patriarchate of Babylon of the Chaldean Catholic church being in Salmas during his reign.

Mar Shimun XI Eshuyow like his predecessor Shimun X Eliyah was not formally recognized by Rome, after the hereditary Shimun line of Patriarchs was reintroduced by Patriarch Shimun IX Dinkha. Hereditary succession is an unacceptable practice by the Roman Catholic Church.

His successor was Shimun XII Yoalaha (1656–1662).

See also
 Patriarch of the Church of the East
 List of patriarchs of the Church of the East
 List of Chaldean Catholic patriarchs of Babylon

Chaldean Catholic Patriarchs of Babylon
1656 deaths
Year of birth unknown
17th-century Eastern Catholic archbishops
17th-century people of Safavid Iran